Kom Kug is a populated place situated in Pima County, Arizona, United States. The name is derived from the Tohono O'odham ko:m ke:k, meaning "hackberry standing".

References

Populated places in Pima County, Arizona